The 2016 African Handball Super Cup (22nd edition), also known as Babacar Fall Super Cup, in honour of the first chairman of the African Handball Confederation, was a handball competition organized by the African Handball Confederation, under the auspices of the International Handball Federation, the handball sport governing body. The matches, held on 5 May 2016 in Laayoune, Western Sahara, were contested by Zamalek, the 2015 African Handball Champions League winner and Espérance Sportive de Tunis, the 2015 African Handball Cup Winners' Cup winner, on the man's side and Clube Desportivo Primeiro de Agosto, the 2015 African Women's Handball Champions League winner and Africa Sports National, the 2015 African Women's Handball Cup Winners' Cup runner-up. ES Tunis, on the man's side and Primeiro de Agosto, on the woman's side, were the winners.

Espérance de Tunis and Primeiro de Agosto qualified for the 2016 IHF Super Globe.

2016 Africa Men's Handball Super Cup

2016 Africa Women's Handball Super Cup

Awards

See also
 2015 African Handball Champions League
 2015 African Women's Handball Champions League
 2015 African Handball Cup Winners' Cup
 2015 African Women's Handball Cup Winners' Cup

References

External links
 Official website

Africa Handball Super Cup
Africa Handball Super Cup
African Handball Super Cup
International handball competitions hosted by Morocco
African Handball Super Cup
May 2016 sports events in Africa